Wilbur Addison Smith (9 January 1933 – 13 November 2021) was a Zambian-born British-South African novelist specialising in historical fiction about international involvement in Southern Africa across four centuries.

An accountant by training, he gained a film contract with his first published novel When the Lion Feeds. This encouraged him to become a full-time writer, and he developed three long chronicles of the South African experience which all became best-sellers. He acknowledged his publisher Charles Pick's advice to "write about what you know best", and his work takes in much authentic detail of the local hunting and mining way of life, along with the romance and conflict that goes with it. 

By the time of his death in 2021 he had published 49 books of which he sold over 140 million copies, 24 million of them in Italy (by 2014).

Early life
Smith was born in Ndola, Northern Rhodesia, (now Zambia), as was his younger sister Adrienne, to Elfreda (née Lawrence, 1913 – ) and Herbert James Smith. He was named after aviator  Wilbur Wright.
 
His father Herbert was a metal worker who opened a sheet metal factory and then created a  cattle ranch on the banks of the Kafue River near Mazabuka, by buying up a number of separate farms. "My father was a tough man", said Smith. "He was used to working with his hands and had massively developed arms from cutting metal. He was a boxer, a hunter, very much a man's man. I don't think he ever read a book in his life, including mine".

As a baby, Smith was sick with cerebral malaria for ten days but made a full recovery. Together with his younger sister he spent the first years of his life on his parents' cattle ranch, comprising  of forest, hills and savanna. On the ranch his companions were the sons of the ranch workers, small black boys with the same interests and preoccupations as Smith. With his companions he ranged through the bush, hiking, hunting, and trapping birds and small mammals. His mother loved books, read to him every night and later gave him novels of escape and excitement, which piqued his interest in fiction; however, his father dissuaded him from pursuing writing.

Education
Smith attended boarding school at Cordwalles Preparatory School in Natal (now KwaZulu-Natal). While in Natal, he continued to be an avid reader and had the good fortune to have an English master who made him his protégé and would discuss the books Smith had read that week. Unlike Smith's father and many others, the English master made it clear to Smith that being a bookworm was praiseworthy, rather than something to be ashamed of, and let Smith know that his writings showed great promise. He tutored Smith on how to achieve dramatic effects, to develop characters, and to keep a story moving forward.

For high school Smith attended Michaelhouse, a boarding school situated in the KwaZulu-Natal Midlands. He felt that he never "fitted in" with the people, goals and interests of the other students at Michaelhouse, but he did start a school newspaper for which he wrote the entire content, except for the sports pages. His weekly satirical column became mildly famous and was circulated as far afield as The Wykeham Collegiate and St Anne's.

Accountant
Smith wanted to become a journalist, writing about social conditions in South Africa, but his father's advice to "get a real job" prompted him to become a tax accountant (chartered accountant).

"My father was a colonialist and I followed what he said until I was in my 20s and learned to think for myself", he said. "I didn't want to perpetuate injustices so I left Rhodesia in the time of Ian Smith."

He attended Rhodes University in Grahamstown, Eastern Cape, South Africa and graduated with a Bachelor of Commerce in 1954. During the university holidays he worked in the gold mines and over the 1953–54 break with his friend Hillary Currey on a fishing boat based out of Walvis Bay and whalers. The next year believing he was tough enough after having worked on a fishing boat he took a Christmas vacation job on a whaling factory ship. He lasted four weeks. Following graduation, he joined the Goodyear Tires and Rubber Co in Port Elizabeth, where he worked until 1958. After selling their ranch his parents had retired to Kloof near Durban in South Africa. Unfortunately some bad investments forced Smith’s father to return to work. In partnership with his son he established in Salisbury the sheet metal manufacturing business of H. J. Smith and Son Ltd. However the business ran into financial difficulties forcing Smith, who was by now 25 and divorced to take a job in 1963 as a tax assessor at the Inland Revenue Service in Salisbury.

Novelist

First novels
With plenty of spare time in the evening and access to plenty of pens and paper through his job at the Inland Revenue Service, Smith turned back to his love of writing. He found that he was able to sell his first story "On Flinder’s Face" under the pen name Steven Lawrence to Argosy magazine in April 1963 for £70, twice his monthly salary. After a number of further acceptances, he wrote his first novel, The Gods First Make Mad, and had by 1962 received 20 rejections. Reviewing what he had written Smith could see that he had a novel of 180,000 words, yet it was long, badly written, had too many characters and tried to express an opinion on everything from politics and racial tension to women. 
  
Dejected he returned to work as an accountant, until when he was 27 years old he received a telegram from Ursula Williams, his agent in London enquiring as to progress on his new novel. Encouraged by her expectation that he would be writing another novel the urge to write once again overwhelmed him. He commenced work on another novel:
I wrote about my own father and my darling mother. I wove into the story chunks of early African history. I wrote about black people and white. I wrote about hunting and gold mining and carousing and women. I wrote about love and loving and hating. In short I wrote about all the things I knew well and loved better. I left out all the immature philosophies and radical politics and rebellious posturing that had been the backbone of the first novel. I even came up with a catching title, When the Lion Feeds.
When the Lion Feeds tells the stories of two young men, twins Sean and Garrick Courtney. The characters' surname was a tribute to Smith's grandfather, Courtney Smith, who had been a transport rider during the Witwatersrand gold rush in the late 1880s, had commanded a Maxim gun team during the Zulu Wars. He had also hunted elephant both as sport and to provide meat for his family. Courtney Smith had a magnificent moustache and could tell wonderful stories that had helped inspire his grandson.

After reading the manuscript Smith's agent in London, Ursula Winant, rang Charles Pick the deputy managing director of William Heinemann and convinced him to look at the novel. She also asked for an advance of £500 and a guaranteed initial print run of 5,000 copies, and that it was to be published before Christmas. After being impressed after reading the first chapter of the novel over the weekend Pick gave it to the company’s sales director Tim Manderson, who agreed that it should be published. Pick rang Winant and offered an advance of £1,000, with an initial print run of 10,000 copies. By the publication date Heinemanns had increased the print run to 20,000.

The book went on to be successful, selling around the world (except in South Africa, where it was banned) and enabling Smith to leave his job and write full-time. Charles Pick later became Smith's mentor and agent. Smith says Pick gave him advice he never forgot: "Write for yourself, and write about what you know best." Pick also advised: "Don't talk about your books with anybody, even me, until they are written." Smith has said that, "Until it is written a book is merely smoke on the wind. It can be blown away by a careless word."

In 2012, Smith said When the Lion Feeds remained his favourite because it was his first to be published. Film rights were bought by Stanley Baker but no movie resulted. However, the money enabled Smith to quit his job in the South African taxation office, calculating he had enough to not have to work for two years.

"I hired a caravan, parked it in the mountains, and wrote the second book", he said. "I knew it was sort of a watershed. I was 30 years of age, single again, and I could take the chance."
Smith's second published novel was The Dark of the Sun (1965), a tale about mercenaries during the Congo Crisis. Film rights were sold to George Englund and MGM and it was filmed in 1968 starring Rod Taylor.

Smith did not originally envision the Courtney family from When the Lion Feeds would become a series, but he returned to them for The Sound of Thunder (1966), taking the lead characters up to after the Second Boer War. At the time he was writing The Sound of Thunder in a caravan in the Inyanga mountains in November 1965 Ian Smith unilaterally declared  Rhodesian independence. The resulting political violence forced Smith to return to the relative safety of Salisbury where he continued working on the novel during the day, while serving at night as a member of the reserve of the Rhodesian Police. "I would get called out and have to get bodies of children from pit lavatories after they had been killed with pangas (machetes)", he recalled. As Smith didn’t share Ian Smith's views he moved with his now pregnant second wife to Onrus River near Hermanus in South Africa.   

Shout at the Devil (1968) was a World War I adventure tale which would be filmed in 1976. It was followed by Gold Mine (1970), an adventure tale about the gold mining industry set in contemporary South Africa, based on a real-life flooding of a gold mine near Johannesburg in 1968.

The Diamond Hunters (1971) was set in contemporary West Africa, later filmed as The Kingfisher Caper (1975). Around this time, Smith also wrote an original screenplay, The Last Lion (1971) which was filmed in South Africa with Jack Hawkins; it was not a success.

The Sunbird
Smith admits to being tempted by movie money at this stage of his career but deliberately wrote something that was a complete change of pace, The Sunbird (1972). 
It was a very important book for me in my development as a writer because at that stage I was starting to become enchanted by the lure of Hollywood. There had been some movies made of my books and I thought "whoa, what a way to go… All that money!" and I thought "hold on—am I a scriptwriter or am I a real writer?" Writing a book that could never be filmed was my declaration of independence. I made it so diffuse, with different ages and brought characters back as different entities. It was a complex book, it gave me a great deal of pleasure but that was the inspiration—to break free.
Eagle in the Sky (1974) was more typical fare, as was The Eye of the Tiger (1975). Film rights for both were bought by Michael Klinger who was unable to turn them into movies; however, Klinger did produce films of Gold (1974) and Shout at the Devil (1976).

Cry Wolf (1976) was a return to historical novels, set during the Italian invasion of Ethiopia in 1935. He then returned to the Courtney family of his first novel with A Sparrow Falls (1977), set during and after World War I. Hungry as the Sea (1978) and Wild Justice (1979) were contemporary stories—the latter was his first best seller in the USA.

Move to Pan Macmillan
He embarked on a new series of historical novels, centering around the fictitious Ballantyne family, who helped colonise Rhodesia: A Falcon Flies (1980), Men of Men (1981), The Angels Weep (1982) and The Leopard Hunts in Darkness (1984).
The Burning Shore (1985) saw him return to the Courtney family, from World War I onwards. He called this a "breakthrough" book for him "because the female lead kicked the arse of all the males in the book." 
Following the publication of The Burning Shore Charles Pick retired from Heinemann in 1985. As Smith did not want to lose Pick’s input and needed someone to oversee his contract and develop his readership, he asked him to become his literary agent. Pick agreed, setting up  in business as Charles Pick Consultancy. Pick was able to secure a better contract for Smith, which involved Smith moving to Pan Macmillan, who had previously only been his paperback publisher.   

Smith stayed with the Courtney family for Power of the Sword (1986) (up to World War II), Rage (1987) (the post-war period up until the Sharpeville massacre), A Time to Die (1989) (the war in Mozambique) and Golden Fox (1990) (the Angola War).

Elephant Song (1991) was a more contemporary tale, but then he kicked off a new cycle of novels set in Ancient Egypt: River God (1993) and The Seventh Scroll (1995). He returned to the Courtneys for Birds of Prey (1997) and Monsoon (1999), then published another Ancient Egyptian story, Warlock (2001).

Blue Horizon (2003) was a historical Courtney tale and The Triumph of the Sun (2005) had the Courtneys meet the Ballantynes. The Quest (2007) was in Ancient Egypt then Assegai (2009) had the Courtneys. Those in Peril (2011) was contemporary, as was Vicious Circle (2013). Desert God (2014) brought Smith back to Ancient Egypt.

Later career: Move to HarperCollins and using co-writers
In December 2012, it was announced that Smith was leaving his English-language publisher of 45 years, Pan Macmillan, to move to HarperCollins. As part of his new six book deal, Smith wrote select novels with co-writers, in addition to writing books on his own. In a press release Smith was quoted as saying: "For the past few years my fans have made it very clear that they would like to read my novels and revisit my family of characters faster than I can write them. For them, I am willing to make a change to my working methods so the stories in my head can reach the page more frequently."

The first of the co-written novels was Golden Lion (2015), a Courtney novel. Predator (2016) was contemporary. Pharaoh (2016) brought him back to Ancient Egypt. In 2021 Picadilly Press published two books for young readers by Wilbur Smith, co-written with Chris Wakling  – Cloudburst and Thunderbolt.

Move to Bonnier Zaffre
In 2017 Smith left Harper Collins to join  Bonnier Zaffre, which gave them language rights to eight new books, together with the English language rights to 34 of Smith’s backlist titles. His new publisher announced at the time of the signing that they would continue the existing release schedule, instigated by HarperCollins, of two titles per year with a number of co-authors, including Corban Addison, David Churchill, Tom Harper and Imogen Robertson.

In 2018 he published his autobiography On Leopard Rock.

Awards
In 2002, the World Forum on the Future of Sport Shooting Activities granted Smith the Inaugural Sport Shooting Ambassador Award.

Personal life
Smith was working for his father when he married his first wife, Anne Rennie, a secretary, in a Presbyterian Church on 5 July 1957 in Salisbury, Rhodesia. "We got on well in the bedroom but not outside it", Smith said. "On our honeymoon, I thought: "What have I got myself into?" but resigned myself to it. " There were two children from this marriage, a son, Shaun, was born on 21 May 1958, and then a daughter, Christian. The marriage ended in 1962.

After being introduced at a party in Salisbury, Smith married his second wife Jewell Slabbart on 28 August 1964. They had a son, Lawrence, following the publication of Smith’s first novel (When the Lion Feeds, 1964). "Everyone looked down on me, including her", he told one interviewer. "We didn't know anything about mutual respect or working together towards a goal—she thought I was useless." This marriage also ended in divorce. Smith later said "On honeymoon I realised I didn't know her [his second wife] well... By the time we divorced, I felt as if I'd been in two car smashes."

Smith then met a young divorcée named Danielle Thomas, who had been born in the same town and had read all of his books, and thought they were wonderful. They married in 1971. Smith later said "she manipulated me. I was making a lot of money and she spent it by the wheelbarrow load... she had intercepted letters from my children. She destroyed my relationship with them because she had a son from a previous marriage and wanted him to be the dauphin."

Smith dedicated his books to her until she died from brain cancer in 1999, following a six-year illness. Smith said:
The first part of our marriage was great. The last part was hell. Suddenly I was living with a different person. They chopped out half Danielle's brain and her personality changed. She became very difficult. I found it very, very hard to spend a lot of time with her because her moods would flick back and forth. She'd say, 'Why am I dying and you are well? It's unfair.' I'd say, 'Look, life isn't fair.' But when she passed away, I was sitting next to her, holding her hand as she took her last breath.

He met his fourth wife, a Tadjik woman named Mokhiniso Rakhimova, in a WHSmith bookstore in London on 18 January 2000.  The two fell in love and married in Cape Town in May 2000. She was a law student studying at Moscow University and younger than him by 39 years.
On their relationship, Smith said:

"It really was love at first sight—and now she's got the best English teacher in the world. Of course people ask about the age gap, but I just say, 'What's 39 years?' Sure, she's young enough to be my daughter, so what?"

When Smith married Danielle Thomas, he cut off contact with his son Shaun and daughter Christian. He was also estranged from his son Lawrence. "My relationship with their mothers broke down and because of what the law was they went with their mothers and were imbued with their mothers' morality in life and they were not my people any more", he said. "They didn't work. They didn't behave in a way I like. I'm quite a selfish person. I'm worried about my life and the people who are really important to me." He became close to Danielle's son from a previous relationship, Dieter Schmidt, and adopted him. Smith and Shaun subsequently reconciled. In 2002 he and Schmidt wound up in court in a dispute over assets and they became estranged. Smith:
"What I do, and I know it's a mistake but I just can't help myself, is I get into a relationship and I just want to give that person everything... I'm overgenerous. Then if they turn on me, I cut them off, it's finished. I'm not the easiest guy in the world, I can tell you, but if you are onside with me you can have everything, I'll lay down my life for you, you can go and help yourself to the bank account virtually. But if you let me down, then bye-bye-blackbird."

Smith’s father had owned a Tiger Moth during the period when the family was cattle ranching. Smith followed in his footsteps gaining a private pilot's licence in the mid-to-late 1960s, which allowed him to fly all over Africa. However after a bad experience he gave up piloting in 1974. He had homes in London, Bishopscourt in Cape Town, Switzerland and Malta. 

After having visited it for a number of years he purchased  of land at the southern end of the island of Cerf in the Seychelles in 1989. After developing the property over a number of years to include three houses, boats, emergency generators and desalination plants, he sold it in 2001 together with three motorboats.

Death
Smith died unexpectedly on 13 November 2021 at his Cape Town home; he was 88. His website announced that "He leaves behind him a treasure-trove of novels, as well as completed and yet to be published co-authored books and outlines for future stories."

Courtney series 

The Courtney series is divided into three parts, each of which follows a particular era of the Courtney family.

In chronological order, the parts are Third Sequence, First Sequence, then Second Sequence.
However, this is a slight generalisation, so in fact the book sequence is as follows, with publication dates in parentheses:
 Birds of Prey 1660s (1997) (Birds of Prey series)
 Golden Lion 1670s (2015) (with Giles Kristian)
 Monsoon 1690s (1999) (Birds of Prey series)
 The Tiger's Prey 1700s (2017) (with Tom Harper)
 Blue Horizon 1730s (2003) (Birds of Prey series)
 Ghost Fire 1754 (2019) (with Tom Harper)
 Storm Tide 1774 (2022) (with Tom Harper)
 When the Lion Feeds 1860s–1890s (1964) (When the Lion Feeds Series)
 The Triumph of the Sun 1880s (2005) (Courtney and Ballantyne)
 King of Kings 1887 (2019) (with Imogen Robertson) (Courtney and Ballantyne)
 The Sound of Thunder 1899–1906 (1966) (When the Lion Feeds Series)
 Assegai 1906–1918 (2009) (Assegai series)
 The Burning Shore 1917–1920 (1985) (The Burning Shore Series)
 War Cry 1918–1939 (2017) (with David Churchill) (Assegai series)
 A Sparrow Falls 1918–1925 (1977) (When the Lion Feeds Series)
 Power of the Sword 1931–1948 (1986) (The Burning Shore series)
 Courtney's War 1939 (2018) (with David Churchill) (Assegai series)
 Rage 1950s and 1960s (1987) (The Burning Shore series)
 Legacy of War After WWII (2021) (with David Churchill) (Assegai series)
 Golden Fox 1969–1979 (1990) (The Burning Shore series)
 A Time to Die 1987 (1989) (The Burning Shore series)

Ballantyne series 

The Ballantyne Novels chronicle the lives of the Ballantyne family, from the 1860s through the 1980s, against a background of the history of Rhodesia (now Zimbabwe). The fifth novel seeks to combine the Ballantyne narrative with that of Smith's other family saga, The Courtney Novels.

The books are set in the following time periods:
 A Falcon Flies 1860 (1980)
 Men of Men 1870s–1890s (1981)
 The Angels Weep 1st part 1890s, 2nd part 1977 (1982)
 The Leopard Hunts in Darkness 1980s (1984)
 The Triumph of the Sun 1884 (2005)
 King of Kings 1887 (2019) (with Imogen Robertson)
 Call of the Raven Early 1800s (2020) (with Corban Addison)

Ancient Egypt series 
The Ancient Egypt series is an historical fiction series based in large part on Pharaoh Memnon's time, addressing both his story and that of his mother Lostris through the eyes of his mother's slave Taita, and mixing in elements of the Hyksos' domination and eventual overthrow.

River God (1993)
The Seventh Scroll (1995)*
Warlock (2001)
The Quest (2007)
 Desert God (2014)
 Pharaoh (2016)
 The New Kingdom (2021) (with Mark Chadbourn)
 Titans of War (2022) (with Mark Chadbourn)
* The Seventh Scroll is set in modern times but reflects the other books in the series via archaeological discoveries.

Influences
As a child, Smith enjoyed reading Biggles books and Just William (1922), as well as the works of John Buchan, C. S. Forester and H. Rider Haggard.  Other authors he admired include Lawrence Durrell, Robert Graves, Ernest Hemingway and John Steinbeck.

"I always think I am from the 17th century", said Smith. "I have no interest in technology, or to rush, rush, rush through life. I like to take time to smell the roses and the buffalo dung."

He says he has tried to live by the advice of Charles Pick, his first publisher:
He said, "Write only about those things you know well." Since then I have written only about Africa... He said, "Do not write for your publishers or for your imagined readers. Write only for yourself." This was something that I had learned for myself. Charles merely confirmed it for me. Now, when I sit down to write the first page of a novel, I never give a thought to who will eventually read it. He said, "Don't talk about your books with anybody, even me, until they are written." Until it is written a book is merely smoke on the wind. It can be blown away by a careless word. I write my books while other aspiring authors are talking theirs away. He said, "Dedicate yourself to your calling, but read widely and look at the world around you, travel and live your life to the full, so that you will always have something fresh to write about." It was advice I have taken very much to heart. I have made it part of my personal philosophy. When it is time to play, I play very hard. I travel and hunt and scuba dive and climb mountains and try to follow the advice of Rudyard Kipling; "Fill the unforgiving minute with sixty seconds' worth of distance run." When it is time to write, I write with all my heart and all my mind.

Criticism

Although many respected historians and authentic news letters endorse Smith's work, some critics have accused it of not having  been thoroughly researched. One of Smith's main critics, Martin Hall, asserts in his article in the Journal of Southern African Studies that the novels present biased, illiberal views against African nationalism. Other critics claim that misogynistic, homophobic, and racist assumptions as well as political agendas are present in these novels.

Chronological bibliography

Filmography
Several of Smith's novels have been turned into movies and TV shows.
The Dark of the Sun (1965), filmed as The Mercenaries (1968) starring Rod Taylor, Jim Brown and Yvette Mimieux
Gold Mine (1970), filmed as Gold (1974) starring Roger Moore and Susannah York
The Diamond Hunters (1971), filmed as The Kingfisher Caper (1975) film and as The Diamond Hunters (2001) TV series starring Roy Scheider and Alyssa Milano
Shout at the Devil (1968), filmed as Shout at the Devil (1976) starring Roger Moore, Lee Marvin and Barbara Parkins
Wild Justice (1979), filmed as Wild Justice but was released to video titled Covert Assassin (1993) starring Roy Scheider
The Burning Shore (1985), filmed as Burning Shore (1991) starring Isabelle Gélinas, Derek de Lint and Jason Connery
River God (1993) and The Seventh Scroll (1995), filmed as The Seventh Scroll (1999) TV miniseries starring Roy Scheider, Jeff Fahey and Karina Lombard
In 1976 Smith said "At first I didn't have complete control over the screenplay when my novels were turned into films. Now I tell the producer and director that they either use my screenplay or else there is no movie. That saves a lot of time."

References

Further reading

External links

 
Popularising Late-Apartheid South Africa – An Interview with Wilbur Smith Conducted by John A. Stotesbury in January 1996.
 

1933 births
2021 deaths
20th-century South African novelists
21st-century South African novelists
Zambian writers
British Book Award winners
Zambian people of English descent
English people of Zambian descent
Zambian emigrants to South Africa
British historical novelists
Alumni of Michaelhouse
Rhodes University alumni
People from Makhanda, Eastern Cape
Naturalised citizens of the United Kingdom
20th-century Zambian writers
People from Kabwe District